Colegio Inmaculada Concepción is a Chilean Private high school located in San Fernando, Colchagua Province, Chile.

References

External links 

Educational institutions with year of establishment missing
Secondary schools in Chile
Schools in Colchagua Province